Weiyuan Fort is a coastal-defense fort, now in ruins, in Humen, Dongguan, Guangdong, China. The fort was constructed in 1835 and was in use during the Opium Wars. The fort is situated immediately under the Humen Bridge. There were 44 cannons there to defend against the British, 40 dark artillery and four open fort. It is 360 meters in length. Admission is free, with valid documents.

History

Plans for Weiyuan Fort was drawn up in 1834 as part of efforts by the Qing government to fortify the Humen strait in the Pearl River Delta. After the construction of four major forts along the straits, Lu Kun suggested that another fort be constructed in the style of a crossed platform, which was Weiyuan Fort. At the same time, Yong'an Fort was built on the western end of an island in the strait and Gonggu Fort was constructed on the opposite bank in the foothills of Luwan Mountain. Weiyuan Fort was captured in the 1841 Battle of the Bogue, 1847 Expedition to Canton, and 1856 Battle of the Bogue.

Gallery

References

Notes

Works cited

External links 

Buildings and structures in Dongguan
Forts in China